Israeli Basketball Leumit Cup is the cup competition for the teams from the Liga Leumit the second tier level of basketball competition in Israel.

Background

The tournament was first established in 2021-2022 season after that the Israeli Basketball Association announcement for a change on the format State Cup When only the first eight teams at the end of the first half of the regular season from the Israeli Basketball Premier League participate.

Finals

References

Israeli Basketball National League Cup
Basketball cup competitions in Europe